South Dublin County Council is the authority responsible for local government in the county of South Dublin, Ireland. It is one of three local authorities created by the Local Government (Dublin) Act 1993 to succeed the former Dublin County Council before its abolition on 1 January 1994 and one of four councils in County Dublin. As a county council, it is governed by the Local Government Act 2001. The council is responsible for housing and community, roads and transportation, urban planning and development, amenity and culture, and environment. The council has 40 elected members. Elections are held every five years and are by single transferable vote. The head of the council has the title of Mayor. The county administration is headed by a Chief Executive, Daniel McLoughlin. The county town is Tallaght, with a civic centre at Monastery Road, Clondalkin. It serves a population of approximately 192,000.

The council is the third largest local authority in Ireland with a population of 265,205 (Census 2011), 90,000 households, and 6,000 businesses, covering an area of 222.74 square kilometres. There are 183,336 local government electors and 174,349 Dáil electors registered to vote in the County Council administrative area.

History
South Dublin County Council came into being on 1 January 1994.

The county council initially met in the Regional Technical College, Tallaght. A new building, County Hall, was purpose-built for the county council and was completed in 1994.

Legal status
The Local Government Act 2001 established a two-tier structure of local government. The Local Government Reform Act 2014 abolished this two-tier structure in favour of city councils, county councils and two hybrid councils, dubbed City and County Councils . South Dublin County Council gained an additional 14 seats due to this re-structuring.

The Local Government Act 1994 defines how an authority may act. The local authority may provide,
amenities, facilities and services related to; artistic and cultural activities, sports, games and similar activities, general recreational and leisure activities, civic improvements, environmental and heritage protection and improvement, and the public use of amenities. It may also act as a library authority.

Governance

Management
The Corporate Policy Group (CPG) consists of the Mayor together with the Chairs of each of the Strategic Policy Committees (SPC). The CPG is supported by the County Manager. Its function is to co-ordinate the work of the Committees so that policy decisions can be discussed and agreed for recommendation to the full council. "The CPG acts as a sort of Cabinet for the council and is supported by the County Manager."

Mayor and Deputy Mayor
The Mayor and Deputy Mayor are chosen from among the councillors.

Local electoral areas
South Dublin County Council is divided into the following local electoral areas, defined by electoral divisions.

Councillors

2019 seats summary

Councillors by electoral area 
This list reflects the order in which councillors were elected on 24 May 2019.

Co-options

Changes in affiliation

Notes

Polling scheme
For administrative and electoral purposes, the county council organises Dublin South into a hierarchy of electoral units. These are: local electoral areas, polling districts, townlands, and polling places for voting. This hierarchical structure is called a polling scheme. The most recent polling scheme was adopted by the county council on 13 September 2010 and went into operation on 15 February 2011.

There are four Dáil constituencies in the county:
Dublin Mid-West
Dublin Rathdown
Dublin South-Central
Dublin South-West

and seven Local electoral areas:
Clondalkin
Firhouse-Bohernabreena
Lucan
Palmerstown-Fonthill
Rathfarnham-Templeogue
Tallaght Central
Tallaght South

The constituencies and electoral areas are organised as follows:
Dublin Mid-West constituency contains local electoral areas Clondalkin, Lucan and Palmerstown-Fonthill
Dublin South contains Rathfarnham-Templeogue and Firhouse-Bohernabreena
Dublin South-Central contains Rathfarnham-Templeogue
Dublin South-West contains Tallaght Central, Tallaght South, Firhouse Bohernabreena and Rathfarnham-Templeogue

Some overlaps occur: Rathfarnham-Templeogue local electoral area occupies parts of three constituencies: Dublin South, Dublin South-Central and Dublin South-West. Firhouse-Bohernabreena local electoral area occupies parts of two constituencies: Dublin South-Central and Dublin South-West.

The following tables illustrate the detailed administrative-electoral county structure, or polling scheme:

Controversies

2019 Wetlands Destruction
In 2019, South Dublin County Council sanctioned the mass dumping of silt in a wetlands park which it had previously vowed to protect. A large part of the park's ecosystem was destroyed, buried under several feet of silt which was then leveled with heavy machinery. The destruction enraged environmental groups, who estimated that thousands of animals were buried and killed, including several protected and endangered species. In response, the council confirmed that they would review their silt disposal process, while admitting no wrongdoing.

References

External links

Local government in County Dublin
Politics of South Dublin (county)
County councils in the Republic of Ireland